Rhythm and Business is an album by the American band Tower of Power. It was released in 1997. The band promoted the album by playing the Red Sea Jazz Festival, among other concert dates.

Production
The album was produced by bandmember Emilio Castillo. The band had decided not to chase any kind of market trend, and instead record what it wanted. Castillo, Stephen Kupka, and Frances Pocco Presita were the only founding members who played on Rhythm & Business. The title track is about the state of 1990s R&B and the music industry.

Critical reception

The Boston Globe wrote that "the implausibly soulful baritone sax of Stephen 'Doc' Kupka, Castillo's partner since 1969, is highlighted on 'Spank-A-Dang' and 'East Bay Way'." The Los Angeles Daily News noted that "Tower of Power has never lost the ability to turn up the heat on slippery funk grooves and soulful ballads." 

The Blade deemed the album "plain old funk and soul," writing that "at times, it's like listening in on a jam session as the horns blare and the drums pound." The Sunday News called it "a funky soul assembly of churning Hammond organ, snappy chicken-scratch rhythm guitar, ear-bending wah-wah guitar, high-powered thumb-popping funk bass, soaring gospel-tinged soul singing and those nasty, legendary, extraordinary Tower of Power horns."

AllMusic wrote that "these guys know all there is to know about R&B and on Rhythm & Business they combine their musical passion, knowledge and abilities into that one-of-a-kind Tower of Power sound." Christina Cole, of the Anchorage Daily News, listed the album among the best of 1997.

Track listing

References

Tower of Power albums
1997 albums
Epic Records albums